Silver Lake is located in North Cascades National Park, in the U. S. state of Washington. To the north and west of Silver Lake lies the arête known as Custer Ridge culminating in Mount Rahm.

References

Lakes of Washington (state)
North Cascades National Park
Lakes of Whatcom County, Washington